Lars Martin Jørgensen (born 6 October 1975) is a Danish former professional footballer played as a midfielder or defender. He works as talent manager for AGF.

Jørgensen amassed 102 caps and scored 12 goals for the Denmark national team. He is the only player that has represented Denmark at three FIFA World Cups. He has also played at two European Championship tournaments. After Denmark's elimination from the 2010 World Cup, Jørgensen announced his retirement from the national team. As he was close to reach his anniversary match no.100 for the national team, the coach Morten Olsen however decided to call him up for one last farewell match, in November 2010. After a brief retirement, he returned to the national team as he was called up for the Euro 2012 qualifying match against Norway on 6 September 2011.

He is the older brother of retired Danish football player Mads Jørgensen.

Club career
Born in Ryomgård on Djursland, he began his club career at the local club IF Midtdjurs. Jørgensen moved to AGF as a youngster in 1989, where his footballing talent was recognized as he was chosen to represent various Danish youth national teams from 1991 onward. He made his senior debut for AGF on 8 May 1994 in a match against Silkeborg IF, and was a part of the team that won the 1996 Danish Cup trophy. 

His contract with AGF had a release clause permitting Jørgensen to leave the club on a free transfer in April 1997. He moved to Italy, to play alongside fellow Dane Thomas Helveg at Udinese in the Serie A championship. He helped Udinese finish third in the 1997–98 season. 

After spending seven years at Udinese, Jørgensen moved to league rivals Fiorentina in August 2004, when the club bought half of Jørgensen's transfer fee rights. He proved to be a key asset to Fiorentina's offensive play and became beloved by the fans. As an attacking midfielder, he played close to the two strikers and during the 2007–08 season he also served as a right back for the majority of the season. He had important contributions for Fiorentina during that season, scoring two goals in the UEFA Cup fixture against IF Elfsborg, and being a key part of the 3–2 win over Juventus on 2 March 2008. 

Jørgensen's 2008–09 season was plagued by an early onset of muscular injuries that left him out of the team until February 2009. He stated that once his time in Florence finished he would like to return to Aarhus before retiring. Despite a difficult season, he signed a contract extension to remain part of Fiorentina until June 2010. Jørgensen scored a crucial 90th-minute equalizer against Lecce which secured Fiorentina the fourth and final Champions League slot.

On 9 December 2009, Jørgensen scored the first goal in Fiorentina's 2–1 win over Liverpool at Anfield, his first career goal in the Champions League, after receiving a through-pass from Alberto Gilardino on a counterattack. Fiorentina claimed top spot in the group with this win, having already eliminated Liverpool a fortnight prior.

On the second last day of the transfer window, 31 January 2010, Jørgensen returned to his childhood club, Danish AGF for an undisclosed fee. At that point he had six months contract left with La viola.

On 11 November 2014, Jørgensen announced his decision to retire from football by the end of 2014.

International career
Jørgensen was a prolific player for the various Danish youth teams. He was named 1996 Danish under-21 Player of the Year, and eventually set a record of 31 games for the Danish under-21 national team, scoring nine goals.

He made his debut for the senior Denmark national team on 25 March 1998 against Scotland, under national team coach Bo Johansson. He was chosen to represent Denmark at the 1998 FIFA World Cup, where he got his international breakthrough. He took part in all five Denmark matches at the tournament and scored the opening goal in the 3–2 quarter-final defeat to eventual runners-up Brazil.

Jørgensen was called up by Johansson to compete for Denmark at the 2000 European Championship, despite being injured. The tournament was no success for Jørgensen, who played a single game as Denmark were eliminated in the preliminary group stage. He made his second World Cup appearance, under new coach Morten Olsen, at the 2002 FIFA World Cup. He played in Denmark's three group stage matches, before suffering an injury which kept him from playing the second round where Denmark were eliminated. At the 2004 European Championship, Jørgensen played in all Denmark's four matches before elimination.

Coaching career
In the winter 2014, Jørgensen was hired as playing assistant manager at AGF, a position he had for six months. He continued as player without any coaching role from the summer 2014 until new year, where he retired as a player. He then became coach of the U14-team in January 2015.

One month after he was hired as U14 coach in AGF, he was also hired as the assistant manager of the Danish national team. In the summer of 2015, however, his role changed from U14 coach to talent coach, while he continued as assistant manager on the national team. He left the post as assistant manager in January 2016.

Career statistics

Club

Notes

International

Scores and results list Denmark's goal tally first, score column indicates score after each Jørgensen goal.

Honours
AGF
 Danish Cup: 1995–96

Individual
 Danish under-21 Player of the Year: 1996

See also
 List of men's footballers with 100 or more international caps

References

Martin Jørgensen stopper karrieren‚ bold.dk, 11 November 2014
Hareide dropper Olsens assistenter‚ bold.dk, 5 February 2016

External links
 
 Martin Jørgensen's official homepage
 
 Official Danish Superliga stats
 
 Italian League stats at gazzetta.it

1975 births
Living people
Footballers from Aarhus
Danish men's footballers
Association football fullbacks
Association football midfielders
Association football utility players
Denmark youth international footballers
Denmark under-21 international footballers
Denmark international footballers
UEFA Euro 2000 players
UEFA Euro 2004 players
1998 FIFA World Cup players
2002 FIFA World Cup players
2010 FIFA World Cup players
FIFA Century Club
Danish Superliga players
Serie A players
IF Midtdjurs players
Aarhus Gymnastikforening players
Udinese Calcio players
ACF Fiorentina players
People from Syddjurs Municipality
Danish expatriate men's footballers
Danish expatriate sportspeople in Italy
Expatriate footballers in Italy